This is a list of schools in Ceredigion in Wales.

Primary schools

Aberaeron Primary School
Aberporth Primary School
Beulah Primary School
Cardigan Primary School
Cenarth Primary School
Cilcennin Primary School
Ciliau Parc Primary School
Coedybryn Primary School
Comins Coch Primary School
Craig Yr Wylfa Primary School
Cwmpadarn Primary School
Cwrtnewydd Primary School
Dihewyd Primary School
Felinfach Primary School
Llanafan Primary School
Llanarth Primary School
Llanddewi Brefi Primary School
Llandysul Primary School
Llanfarian Primary School
Llanfihangel-Y-Creuddyn Primary School
Llangwyryfon Primary School
Llangynfelyn Primary School
Llanilar Primary School
Llannon Primary School
Llanwenog Primary School
Llanwnnen Primary School
Llechryd Primary School
Llwyn Yr Eos Primary School
Myfenydd Primary School
Mynach Primary School
New Quay Primary School
Penllwyn Primary School
Penparc Primary School
Penrhyncoch Primary School
Plascrug Primary School 
Pontrhydfendigaid Primary School 
Pontsiân Primary School
Rhos Helyg Primary School
Rhydypennau Primary School
St Padarn Primary School
Syr John Rhys Primary School
Talgarreg Primary School
Talybont Primary School
Tregaron Primary School
Trewen Primary School
Ysgol Bro Pedr
Ysgol Bro Sion Cwilt
Ysgol Gymraeg Aberystwyth
Ysgol Gynradd Gymraeg
Ysgol T. Llew Jones
Ysgol-Y-Dderi Primary School

Secondary schools
Ysgol Gyfun Aberaeron
Ysgol Gyfun Gymunedol Penweddig
Ysgol Penglais School
Ysgol Uwchradd Aberteifi

All-age schools
Ysgol Bro Pedr
Ysgol Bro Teifi
Ysgol Henry Richard

Further Education colleges
Coleg Ceredigion

 
Ceredigion